Jangsu Hwang clan is one of the Korean clans. Their Bon-gwan is in Jangsu County, North Jeolla Province. According to the research held in 2015, the number of Jangsu Hwang clan’s member was 170988. Hwang Rak, a chief vassal in Han dynasty began Hwang clan in Korea. Hwang Rak had an accident on sea on his way to Vietnam as an envoy in 28 during Emperor Guangwu of Han’s reign. Then, Hwang Rak drifted ashore and was naturalized in Silla. , Hwang Rak’s descendant, became Prince of Jangsu and Jangsu Hwang clan’s founder.

See also 
 Korean clan names of foreign origin

References

External links 
 

 
Korean clan names of Chinese origin
Hwang clans